Ischnocnema octavioi is a species of frog in the family Brachycephalidae.
It is endemic to Brazil.
Its natural habitats are subtropical or tropical moist lowland forest and subtropical or tropical moist montane forest.
It is threatened by habitat loss.

References

octavioi
Endemic fauna of Brazil
Amphibians of Brazil
Taxonomy articles created by Polbot
Amphibians described in 1965